Celadon may refer to:

Celadon, in Chinese pottery, a family of glazes, and also wares in jade-like green colours
Celadon (color), a pale, sea-green pigment
Celadon Trucking, a trucking company based in Indianapolis, Indiana,  USA
 Céladon, a character in L'Astrée by Honoré d'Urfé
Celadon, mythology, was killed by Amykos 
The Celadon, a river in Ancient Greece
Celadon City, a fictional city in the Pokémon series of video games.
Celadon Books, an American imprint of Macmillan Publishers

See also
 Celedón (surname)